The 2005 Porsche Tennis Grand Prix was a women's tennis tournament played on indoor hard courts at the Filderstadt Tennis Club in Filderstadt, Germany that was part of Tier II of the 2005 WTA Tour. It was the 28th edition of the tournament and was held from 3 October until 9 October 2005. First-seeded Lindsay Davenport won the singles title and earned $98,500 first-prize money.

Finals

Singles

 Lindsay Davenport defeated  Amélie Mauresmo 6–2, 6–4
 It was Davenport's 5th singles title of the year and the 50th of her career.

Doubles

 Daniela Hantuchová /  Anastasia Myskina defeated  Květa Peschke /  Francesca Schiavone 6–0, 3–6, 7–5

Prize money

References

External links
 ITF tournament edition details
 Tournament draws

Porsche Tennis Grand Prix
Porsche Tennis Grand Prix
2005 in German tennis
2000s in Baden-Württemberg
Porsch